Octavious Freeman (born April 20, 1992) is an American sprinter who specializes in the 100 and 200 metres. Freeman qualified for the 2013 World Championships in Athletics in Moscow by placing second in the 100 metres at the 2013 USA Outdoor Track and Field Championships with a time of 10.87 (+1.8). In Moscow, Freeman placed 8th in the 100 metres with a time of 11.16 (-0.3).

2016
Freeman ran 60 meters qualifying time for 2016 IAAF World Indoor Championships in Seattle, Washington January 16.

References

External links

  – University of Central Florida athlete profile at UCFathletics.com

1992 births
Living people
American female sprinters
21st-century American women